Crisilla senegalensis is a species of minute sea snail, a marine gastropod mollusc or micromollusc in the family Rissoidae.

References

Rissoidae
Molluscs of the Atlantic Ocean
Invertebrates of West Africa
Gastropods described in 2006